A number of steamships were named Gabbiano, including

, built as a sailing ship by Societa Construzione e Navales Velieri, Viareggio. Later fitted with an auxiliary steam engine.
, in service with Achille Lauro, Naples 1934–40

Ship names